Paregraphus krusemani is a species of beetle in the family Carabidae, the only species in the genus Paregraphus.

References

Panagaeinae